Father Gets in the Game is a 1908 American silent short comedy film directed by D. W. Griffith. A print of the film exists.

Cast
 Mack Sennett as Bill Wilkins
 Harry Solter as Wilkins' Son
 George Gebhardt as Professor Dyem / First Couple
 Linda Arvidson
 Charles Avery as The Butler
 Charles Gorman
 Charles Inslee as Clumsy Waiter (unconfirmed)
 Florence Lawrence as First Couple
 Marion Leonard
 Jeanie MacPherson

References

External links
 
Father Gets in the Game available for free download at Internet Archive

1908 films
1908 comedy films
1908 short films
Silent American comedy films
American silent short films
American black-and-white films
Films directed by D. W. Griffith
American comedy short films
1900s American films